The Minnesota Vikings is an American football franchise based in Minneapolis, Minnesota. The team was established in 1961 and is part of the National Football League's NFC North division. Since then, the team has taken part in the NFL playoffs 31 times, reaching four Super Bowls in 1970, 1974, 1975 and 1977.

This list encompasses the major records set by the team, its coaches and its players. The players section of this page lists the individual records for passing, rushing and receiving, as well as selected defensive records. The team has had three full-time home stadiums since its establishment – Metropolitan Stadium, Hubert H. Humphrey Metrodome, and U.S. Bank Stadium; attendance records, both home and away, are included on this page.

All-time series
The Vikings have played against every other team in the NFL at least five times each in the regular season. They have a winning record against 20 teams, a losing record against 10 and an even record against one: the Cincinnati Bengals, whom they have played 14 times, winning seven each. The Vikings' best record is against the Houston Texans – they have won each of the five meetings between the two teams – and their worst record is against the New York Jets, whom they have beaten just three times in 11 meetings for a win percentage of .273; that is a team record for the fewest wins against another franchise, tied with their three wins in seven meetings with the Baltimore Ravens (.429). The Vikings have recorded the most wins in their history against the Detroit Lions (80), as well as the most points (2,690). The Vikings have conceded the most points to the Green Bay Packers (2,689), who are also the team against whom they have suffered the most losses (63) and ties (3).

In the postseason, the Vikings have faced 18 different opponents, but they only have a win percentage of .500 or higher against six of them. The Vikings' best postseason win percentage is against the Arizona Cardinals and the Cleveland Browns, whom they have beaten every time they have met – the Cardinals twice and the Browns once; meanwhile, they have faced eight teams without recording a single win, the worst being against the Philadelphia Eagles, whom they have met four times without winning. The Vikings have recorded their most postseason wins against the Los Angeles Rams, whom they have beaten five times in seven meetings, and their most losses against the San Francisco 49ers, to whom they have lost five times in six meetings. The Vikings have also conceded their most postseason points against the 49ers (181), and scored their most against the New Orleans Saints (161). As well as meeting the Rams seven times in the postseason, the Vikings have also met the Dallas Cowboys seven times, recording three wins and four losses.

Last updated: As of the end of the 2022 NFL season

Team records

Firsts
First home game: Chicago Bears 13–37 Minnesota Vikings, September 17, 1961
First road game: Minnesota Vikings 7–21 Dallas Cowboys, September 24, 1961
First postseason game: Minnesota Vikings 14–24 Baltimore Colts, Divisional Round, December 22, 1968
First postseason win: Los Angeles Rams 20–23 Minnesota Vikings, Divisional Round, December 27, 1969
First Super Bowl: Minnesota Vikings 7–23 Kansas City Chiefs, Super Bowl IV, January 11, 1970
First game at the Hubert H. Humphrey Metrodome: Seattle Seahawks 3–7 Minnesota Vikings, August 21, 1982
First regular season game at the Metrodome: Tampa Bay Buccaneers 10–17 Minnesota Vikings, September 12, 1982
First game at U.S. Bank Stadium: San Diego Chargers 10–23 Minnesota Vikings, August 28, 2016
First regular season game at U.S. Bank Stadium: Green Bay Packers 14–17 Minnesota Vikings, September 18, 2016

Biggest results
Largest margin of victory (home): 48, Cleveland Browns 3–51 Minnesota Vikings, November 9, 1969
Largest margin of victory (road): 40, Minnesota Vikings 43–3 Dallas Cowboys, November 13, 1988
Largest margin of defeat (home): 37, Dallas Cowboys 40–3 Minnesota Vikings, November 20, 2022
Largest margin of defeat (road): 44, Minnesota Vikings 7–51 San Francisco 49ers, December 8, 1984
Biggest comeback: 33, Minnesota Vikings 39-36 Indianapolis Colts, December 17, 2022 (NFL Record)
Most points scored in a game: 54, Dallas Cowboys 13–54 Minnesota Vikings, October 18, 1970
Most points allowed in a game: 56, St. Louis Cardinals 56–14 Minnesota Vikings, October 6, 1963
Most points in a game (both teams): 89, Minnesota Vikings 41–48 Chicago Bears, October 19, 2008

Wins/losses in a season
Most games won in a season (regular season): 15, 1998
Most games won in a season (including postseason): 16, 1998
Most games lost in a season: 13
1984
2011

Streaks
Most consecutive games won (regular season): 13, 1974–1975
Most consecutive games won (including postseason): 12, 1969
Most consecutive home games won: 15, 1974–1976
Most consecutive road games won: 7
1970–1971
1973–1974
Most consecutive games lost: 8, 2001–2002
Most consecutive home games lost: 5
1966–1967
2011
Most consecutive road games lost: 16, 2000–2002
Most consecutive games scoring: 260, 1991–2007
Most consecutive games with a touchdown: 97, 1995–2001
Most consecutive games with a field goal: 31, 1968–1970

Points
Most points scored in a season: 556, 1998
Fewest points scored in a season: 187, 1982 (season reduced to 9 games)
Fewest points scored in a 16-game season: 259, 1979
Most points allowed in a season: 484, 1984
Fewest points allowed in a season: 133, 1969
Fewest points allowed in a 16-game season: 233, 1988

Touchdowns
Most touchdowns scored in a season: 64, 1998
Fewest touchdowns scored in a season: 23, 1982 (season reduced to 9 games)
Fewest touchdowns scored in a 16-game season: 28, 1993
Most touchdowns allowed in a season: 59, 1984
Fewest touchdowns allowed in a season: 14
1970
1971
Most touchdowns scored in a game: 7
vs. Baltimore Colts, September 28, 1969
vs. Pittsburgh Steelers, November 23, 1969
at Tampa Bay Buccaneers, October 23, 1988
Most touchdowns allowed in a game: 8, vs. St. Louis Cardinals, October 6, 1963
Most touchdowns in a game (both teams): 12, at Chicago Bears, December 17, 1961

Field goals
Most field goals made in a season: 35
1998 (Gary Anderson)
2012 (Blair Walsh)
Most field goals made by opponents in a season: 34, 2006
Fewest field goals made in a season: 8
1977
1982 (season reduced to 9 games)
Most field goals made in a game: 7, vs. Los Angeles Rams, November 5, 1989
Most field goals made by an opponent in a game: 6
vs. Detroit Lions, November 13, 1966
at Detroit Lions, October 17, 1999

Defensive
Most sacks in a game: 10, November 4, 2018
Most sacks allowed in a game: 11, October 28, 1984

Attendances
Largest home attendance (regular season): 67,157, vs. Green Bay Packers, December 23, 2019
Largest home attendance (postseason): 66,612, vs. New Orleans Saints, NFC Divisional Playoff Game, January 14, 2018
Largest road attendance (regular season): 90,608, at Washington Redskins, September 11, 2006
Largest road attendance (postseason): 103,438, vs. Oakland Raiders, Super Bowl XI, Rose Bowl, Pasadena, January 9, 1977
Largest total home attendance in a season: 534,804, 2019 (8 games)
Smallest home attendance (regular season): 0, vs. Green Bay Packers, September 13, 2020, Tennessee Titans, September 27, 2020, Atlanta Falcons, October 18, 2020, Detroit Lions, November 8, 2020, Dallas Cowboys, November 22, 2020, Carolina Panthers, November 29, 2020, Jacksonville Jaguars, December 6, 2020, and Chicago Bears, December 20, 2020.
Restricted fan attendance due to COVID-19 pandemic.
Smallest home attendance without restrictions (regular season): 13,911, vs. Green Bay Packers, October 4, 1987
Smallest home attendance (postseason): 44,626, vs. St. Louis Cardinals, Divisional Round, December 21, 1974
Smallest home attendance at the Metrodome (postseason): 57,353, vs. Washington Redskins, Wildcard Round, January 2, 1993
Smallest road attendance (regular season): 0, at Seattle Seahawks, October 11, 2020, at Green Bay Packers, November 1, 2020, and at Chicago Bears, November 16, 2020.
Restricted fan attendance due to COVID-19 pandemic.
Smallest road attendance without restrictions (regular season): 12,992, at Dallas Cowboys, September 24, 1961
Smallest road attendance (postseason): 54,593, at Washington Redskins, Divisional Round, January 15, 1983

Individual records
Note: Bold indicates the record is still active as of the end of the 2022 NFL season.

Most career passing yards

Most career passing touchdowns

Most career rushing yards

Most career rushing touchdowns

Most career receiving yards

Most career receiving touchdowns

Most career points

Most career interceptions

Most career sacks

Most career tackles

Scoring
Most touchdowns in a season: 41, Daunte Culpepper (2004)
Most touchdowns in a season (non-QB): 22, Chuck Foreman (1975)
Most rushing touchdowns in a season: 18, Adrian Peterson (2009)
Most rushing touchdowns in a rookie season: 12, Adrian Peterson (2007)
Most rushing touchdowns in a game: 3, 19 times 

Tommy Mason
Clinton Jones
Chuck Foreman ×2
D. J. Dozier
Herschel Walker
Daunte Culpepper
Onterrio Smith
Artose Pinner
Adrian Peterson ×5
Chester Taylor
Matt Asiata ×3
Dalvin Cook

Most consecutive games with a rushing TD: 7
Moe Williams (2002)
Dalvin Cook (2020)
Most passing touchdowns in a season: 39, Daunte Culpepper (2004)
Most passing touchdowns in a rookie season: 18, Fran Tarkenton (1961)
Most passing touchdowns in a game: 7, Joe Kapp (September 28, 1969) – NFL record
Most consecutive games with a passing TD: 39, Kirk Cousins (2020–2022)
Most receiving touchdowns in a season: 17
Cris Carter (1995)
Randy Moss (twice: 1998, 2003)
Most receiving touchdowns in a rookie season: 17, Randy Moss (1998)
Most receiving touchdowns in a game: 4, Ahmad Rashad (September 2, 1979)
Most consecutive games with a receiving TD: 10, Randy Moss (2003–2004)
Most points scored in a season: 164, Gary Anderson (1998)
Most points scored in a rookie season: 141, Blair Walsh (2012)

Rushing
Most rushing attempts in a career: 2,418, Adrian Peterson (2007–2016)
Most rushing attempts in a season: 363, Adrian Peterson (2008)
Most rushing attempts in a rookie season: 238, Adrian Peterson (2007)
Most rushing attempts in a game: 35, Adrian Peterson (December 1, 2013)
Most consecutive attempts without a fumble: 478, Robert Smith (1996–1998)
Most rushing yards in a season: 2,097, Adrian Peterson (2012)
Most rushing yards in a rookie season: 1,341, Adrian Peterson (2007)
Most rushing yards in a game: 296, Adrian Peterson (November 4, 2007) – NFL record
Longest run: 95, Chester Taylor (October 22, 2006)
Most seasons with 1,000+ yards rushing: 7, Adrian Peterson (2007–2010, 2012–2013, 2015)
Most consecutive seasons with 1,000+ yards rushing: 4
Robert Smith (1997–2000)
Adrian Peterson (2007–2010)
Dalvin Cook (2019-2022)
Most games with 100+ yards rushing: 49, Adrian Peterson (2007–2016)
Most games with 200+ yards rushing: 6, Adrian Peterson (2007–2016) – NFL record
Most consecutive games with 100+ yards rushing: 8, Adrian Peterson (October 21, 2012–December 16, 2012)
Most games with 100+ yards rushing in a season: 10, Adrian Peterson (twice: 2008, 2012)

Passing
Most passing attempts in a career: 4,569, Fran Tarkenton (1961–1966, 1972–1978)
Most passing attempts in a season: 643, Kirk Cousins (2022)
Most passing attempts in a rookie season: 402, Teddy Bridgewater (2014)
Most passing attempts in a game: 63, Rich Gannon (October 20, 1991)
Most completions in a career: 2,635, Fran Tarkenton (1961–1966, 1972–1978)
Most completions in a season: 425, Kirk Cousins (2018)
Most completions in a rookie season: 259, Teddy Bridgewater (2014)
Most completions in a game: 45, Kirk Cousins (2018)
Most consecutive completions: 17, Kirk Cousins (October 9, 2022)
Most passing yards in a season: 4,717, Daunte Culpepper (2004)
Most passing yards in a rookie season: 2,919, Teddy Bridgewater (2014)
Most passing yards in a game: 490, Tommy Kramer (November 2, 1986 OT) 
Longest pass completion: 99 yards, Gus Frerotte (to Bernard Berrian) (November 30, 2008)
Longest pass completion by a rookie: 87 yards, Teddy Bridgewater (December 7, 2014)
Most seasons with 3,000+ yards passing: 5, Tommy Kramer (1979–1981, 1985–1986)
Most games with 300+ yards passing: 20, Kirk Cousins (2018-present)
Most consecutive games with 300+ yards passing: 4, Daunte Culpepper (September 20, 2004–October 17, 2004)
Most consecutive attempts without an interception: 193, Warren Moon (1995)

Receiving
Most receptions in a career: 1,004, Cris Carter (1990–2001)
Most receptions in a season: 128, Justin Jefferson (2022)
Most receptions in a rookie season: 88, Justin Jefferson (2020)
Most receptions in a game: 15, Rickey Young (December 16, 1979) 
Most consecutive games with a reception: 111, Cris Carter (1991–1998)
Most seasons with 50+ receptions: 11, Cris Carter (1991–2001)
Most receiving yards in a season: 1,809, Justin  Jefferson (2022)
Most receiving yards in a rookie season: 1,400, Justin Jefferson (2020)
Most receiving yards in a game: 223, Justin Jefferson ( December 11, 2022) 
Longest reception: 99 yards, Bernard Berrian (from Gus Frerotte) (November 30, 2008)
Most seasons with 1,000+ yards receiving: 8, Cris Carter (1993–2000)
Most games with 100+ yards receiving in a career: 41, Randy Moss (1998–2004)
Most games with 100+ yards receiving in a season: 10, Justin Jefferson (2022)
Most consecutive games with 100+ yards receiving: 8, Adam Thielen (2018) – NFL record

Defense
Most tackles in a season: 230, Scott Studwell (1981)
Most tackles in a game: 24, Scott Studwell (November 17, 1985)
Most sacks in a season: 22, Jared Allen (2011)
Most sacks in a game: 5.0, Randy Holloway (September 16, 1984)
Most consecutive games with a sack: 11, Jared Allen (December 28, 2010 – November 14, 2011)
Most fumble recoveries in a career: 29, Jim Marshall (1961–1979)
Most fumble recoveries in a season: 9, Don Hultz (1963) – NFL record
Most fumble recoveries in a game: 3, Joey Browner (September 8, 1985)
Longest fumble recovery: 94, Dwayne Rudd (December 6, 1998)
Most interceptions in a season: 10, Paul Krause (1975)
Most interceptions in a rookie season: 9, Orlando Thomas (1995)
Most consecutive games with an interception: 6
Paul Krause (1968)
Brian Russell (2003)
Longest interception return: 100, Xavier Rhodes (November 20, 2016)

Special teams
Most punts in a career: 720, Greg Coleman (1978–1987)
Most punts in a season: 93, Chris Kluwe (2006) 
Most punts in a rookie season: 75, Jeff Locke (2013)
Most punts in a game: 12, Greg Coleman (November 21, 1982)
Most punts in a game by an opponent: 12, Tom Blanchard (New Orleans Saints – November 21, 1982)
Longest punt: 84 yards Harry Newsome (December 20, 1992)
Longest average gross punt in a career (200 punts minimum): 44.4, Chris Kluwe (2005–2012)
Longest average net punt in a career (200 punts minimum): 38.8, Jeff Locke (2013–2016)
Most punts inside the 20 in a career: 198, Chris Kluwe (2005–2011)
Most punt returns in a career: 237, Marcus Sherels (2011–2019)
Most punt returns in a season: 58, Leo Lewis (1988)
Most punt returns in a rookie season: 48, Kevin Miller (1978)
Most punt returns in a game: 8, Kevin Miller (December 2, 1979)
Most punt return yards in a career: 2,480, Marcus Sherels (2011–2019)
Most punt return yards in a season: 550, Leo Lewis (1988)
Most punt return yards in a rookie season: 247, Keenan Howry (2003)
Most punt return yards in a game: 119, Marcus Sherels (October 21, 2013)
Longest punt return: 98 yards, Charlie West (November 3, 1968)
Longest average punt return in a career (minimum 50): 10.46, Marcus Sherels (2011–2019)
Most punt return touchdowns in a career: 5, Marcus Sherels (2011–2019)
Most kickoff returns in a career: 159, Darrin Nelson (1982–1989, 1991–1992)
Most kickoff returns in a season: 53
Eddie Payton (1980)
Buster Rhymes (1985)
Most kickoff returns in a rookie season: 53, Buster Rhymes (1985)
Most kickoff returns in a game: 9, Nate Jacquet (November 11, 2001)
Most kickoff return yards in a career: 4,075, Cordarrelle Patterson (2013–2016)
Most kickoff return yards in a season: 1,393, Cordarrelle Patterson (2013)
Most kickoff return yards in a rookie season: 1,393, Cordarrelle Patterson (2013)
Most kickoff return yards in a game: 237 yards, Nate Jacquet (November 11, 2001)
Longest kickoff return: 109 yards, Cordarrelle Patterson (October 27, 2013) – NFL record
Longest average kickoff return in a season (minimum 20): 32.4, Cordarrelle Patterson (2013)
Longest average kickoff return in a career (minimum 75): 30.4, Cordarrelle Patterson (2013–2016)
Most kickoff return touchdowns in a career: 5, Percy Harvin (2009–2012) and Cordarrelle Patterson (2013–2016)

References
General

Specific

Statistics
American football team records and statistics